Kelch domain-containing protein 3 is a protein that in humans is encoded by the KLHDC3 gene.

The protein encoded by this gene contains six repeated kelch motifs that are structurally similar to recombination activating gene 2 (RAG2), a protein involved in the activation of the V(D)J recombination. This gene is found to express specifically in testis. Its expression in pachytene spermatocytes is localized to cytoplasm and meiotic chromatin, which suggests that this gene may be involved in meiotic recombination.

References

Further reading

Kelch proteins